Julcimar Conceição de Souza (born 30 July 1978) known as Julcimar, is a former Brazilian footballer who played as a defender and spent the majority of his career playing in Poland.

Career

Julcimar was born in Contagem, Brazil, and started playing football with Belo Horizonte football team Cruzeiro. In 1997 Julcimar was brought to Poland by Polish businessman Antoni Ptak, starting his career in Poland with Piotrcovia Piotrków Trybunalski. In 1998 Julcimar joined II liga side Lechia-Polonia Gdańsk, making his debut on 19 September 1998 against Odra Szczecin, playing in a 2–0 win. During his 6 months with Lechia-Polonia Julcimar made 8 appearances for the club before moving on to I liga side ŁKS Łódź in the January transfer window. Julcimar made his ŁKS and I liga debut on 27 February 1999, playing against Górnik Zabrze. He continued to have short spells at clubs, playing 7 times in the league for Świt Nowy Dwór Mazowiecki and 3 times for Dyskobolia Grodzisk Wlk., spending only a few months with each side. In 2000 he returned to Piotrcovia Piotrków Trybunalski for 6 months, before joining ŁKS Łódź for a season. With ŁKS Julcimar made 31 appearances and scored 1 goal. After short spells with RKS Radomsko and a return to Piotrcovia Piotrków Trybunalski for the third time, Julcimar finally settled down in 2003 with Pogoń Szczecin, spending 4 seasons with the club, and making over 100 league appearances before eventually terminating his career with Ptak in 2007 and returning to Brazil.

Since retiring from football Julcimar has run a footballing school for children aged 5–15.

References

1978 births
Cruzeiro Esporte Clube players
Lechia Gdańsk players
ŁKS Łódź players
Świt Nowy Dwór Mazowiecki players
Dyskobolia Grodzisk Wielkopolski players
RKS Radomsko players
Pogoń Szczecin players
Brazilian footballers
Association football defenders
Living people